Paectes declinata is a species of moth in the family Euteliidae. It is found in North America.

The MONA or Hodges number for Paectes declinata is 8961.

References

Further reading

 
 
 
 

Euteliinae
Articles created by Qbugbot
Moths described in 1879